Harleston is a town  from Norwich, in the civil parish of Redenhall with Harleston, in the South Norfolk district, in the county of Norfolk, England. In 2018 it had an estimated population of 5067. Harleston is on the Norfolk/Suffolk border, close to the River Waveney. Harleston has 2 markets every Wednesday.

Harleston is an electoral ward comprising the civil parishes of Needham, Redenhall with Harleston, and Wortwell. At the last election, in May 2019, two Conservative councillors were elected to South Norfolk Council.

History 
The name "Harleston" possibly means "Heoruwulf" or "Harolds Stone". Harleston was recorded in the Domesday Book as Heroluestuna. Harleston was a chapelry in Reddenhall parish.

The right to hold an eight-day fair during the period of the Beheading of St. John the Baptist was granted to Roger Bigod, 4th Earl of Norfolk by Henry III in 1259.

Many Georgian residences and much earlier buildings, with Georgian frontages, line the streets of Harleston. Although there is no record of a royal charter, Harleston has been a market town since at least 1369 and still holds a Wednesday market.

One of the plots to assassinate Queen Elizabeth I was to be launched on Midsummer Day 1570 at the Harleston Fair by proclamations and the sound of trumpets and drums. The Elizabethan play Friar Bacon and Friar Bungay features this in one of its scenes.

Amenities 
Harleston has a state-funded all-through school called Harleston Sancroft Academy, a football club called Harleston Town which plays at Wilderness Lane, a library on Swan Lane, a museum called Harleston Museum, a police station on 12 Swan Lane and a church called St John the Baptist.

Harleston railway station closed in 1953. The nearest station is now Diss, which is ten miles to the west.

References 

 
Towns in Norfolk
South Norfolk